Morse Farm may refer to:

Asa Morse Farm, a historic farmstead in Dublin, New Hampshire
Eli Morse Farm, a historic farm in Dublin, New Hampshire
Morse Farm (Moravia, New York), a historic farm in Moravia, New York
Capt. Thomas Morse Farm, a farmhouse in Dublin, New Hampshire
Wayne Morse Family Farm, a park and former home of former senator Wayne Morse in Eugene, Oregon